Michael Shelly was an Irish politician. He was elected to Dáil Éireann as a Sinn Féin Teachta Dála (TD) for the Carlow–Kilkenny constituency at the 1923 general election. He stood as a Fianna Fáil candidate at the June 1927 general election but was not elected.

References

Year of birth missing
Year of death missing
Fianna Fáil politicians
Members of the 4th Dáil
Early Sinn Féin TDs